Cutaway van chassis are used by second stage manufacturers for a wide range of completed motor vehicles. Especially popular in the United States, they are usually based upon incomplete vans to be bigger or smaller than pickup trucks and SUVs made by manufacturers such as Chrysler, Ford, and General Motors which are generally equipped with heavier duty components than most of their complete products. To these incomplete vehicles, a second stage manufacturer adds specific equipment and completes the vehicle. Common applications of this type of vehicle design and  manufacturing includes small trucks, school buses, recreational vehicles, minibuses, and ambulances.  The term "cutaway" can be somewhat of a misnomer in most of the vehicle's context since it refers to truck bodies for heavy-duty commercial-grade applications sharing a common truck chassis.

Design history
Following the initial popularity of Volkswagen's imported minibuses, vans made by the domestic manufacturers were developed and became popular in the United States in the 1960s. By the early 1970s, Chrysler Corporation, Ford Motor Company, and General Motors were all manufacturing many models of passenger and utility vans. The Dodge passenger vans of Chrysler had a maximum seating capacity of 14 persons plus the driver, and came to be commonly known as 15 passenger vans, joined by similar sized models by the other manufacturers years later.

Conversions for personal motor homes became very popular, drawing the interest of recreational vehicle manufacturers. Based upon that, cutaway van chassis were developed in the early 1970s to accommodate demand for conversions which were heavier and wider than the standard production vans completed by the major auto and truck manufacturers (i.e. Chevrolet-GM, Dodge, and Ford). As they began working on bigger models of their popular light-duty van products, they developed cutaway van chassis solely for use by second stage manufacturers.

Busette: first of the cutaway school buses
Busette, developed by Wayne Corporation in 1972, was the first successful small school bus to be based on a cutaway van chassis with dual rear wheels. With a low center of gravity and the dual rear wheels, Busette provided a combination of increased seating capacity and handling stability over conventional vans and van conversions.

By the early 1980s, all five of the major school bus body companies in the United States had developed competing products built on the cutaway van chassis. These manufacturers were joined by several others which specialized in small school buses. In the early 1990s, Mid Bus, an Ohio manufacturer specializing in small school buses, purchased the tooling and product rights to build the Busette from Wayne Corporation, and produced Busettes for a few more years. In modern times, more small school buses are based upon cutaway van chassis than any other type.

Most school bus body builders also produce models for non-school use, often called a "commercial minibus".

Manufacture 
As produced by the first stage (van) manufacturers, a cutaway van chassis generally features a van front end and cab design. The body ends immediately behind the driver and front passenger seats, and is usually covered by temporary plywood or heavy cardboard material for shipment to the various second stage manufacturers. It was soon known by the name "cutaway van chassis" in recognition of this feature.  Higher-GVWR vehicles are derived from medium-duty truck chassis.

Second stage manufacturers, known in the industry as "body-builders," build such products as bus and truck bodies, motor homes, and other specialized vehicles. Neither their product, nor the first stage portion, legally defined as an "incomplete motor vehicle" under the Federal Motor Vehicle safety Standards (FMVSS) in the US, are fully compliant with requirements for a complete motor vehicle. Neither portion can be licensed or operated lawfully without the other. Many cutaway chassis are equipped with dual rear wheels and can handle greater weight loads than the basic vans upon which they were based.

Design overview

Ambulances

In the United States, the 1973 National EMS Systems Act, which was passed by Congress in 1974, and implemented four years later (in 1978), required that communities receiving federal funds for their programs had ambulances that met new federal specifications. The regulations included minimum width and other requirements which virtually eliminated car-based vehicles. The last American-made car-based ambulance was built in 1978.

The United States General Services Administration has published a standard for ambulance construction, KKK-A-1822F, which has been adopted by many states and localities, including Nebraska, Illinois, Mississippi, Oregon, and Decatur County, Indiana. Designs based upon the cutaway van chassis with modular bodies are defined as Type III. (Type I uses pickup truck chassis and Type II are straight conversion of van with a raised roof rather than a modular body.)  This standard is due to be withdrawn in 2015 in favor of NFPA 1917.

Many of these models have access between the driver and the patient care area, which for some applications, is a favorable feature over a full cab chassis with a modular box.

The same standards are practiced in Canada, but the legislation defining the types are provincially determined.

Commercial minibuses

Seeking to expand product offerings, several recreational vehicle manufacturers, notably Champion, ElDorado National, Turtletop, and others also developed minibus models using cutaway van chassis and body construction similar to their motor homes.  With their products, they joined the school bus body companies in seeking and expanding markets.

Minibuses customarily have a seating capacity of between 8 and 30 seats. They are used in a wide variety of applications. In a public transport role, they can be used as fixed route transit buses, airport buses, flexible demand responsive transport vehicles, share taxis or large taxicabs. Wheelchair accessible minibuses can also be used for paratransit type services, by local authorities, transit operators, hospitals or charities. Private uses of minibuses can include corporate transport, charter buses, tour buses, and for non-profit organizations such as churches.

Delivery trucks

Cutaway van chassis also found a popular application for delivery vehicles and small trucks. They featured a size and weight capacity similar to the earlier step van model trucks and more of an automobile style cab area.

With easier adjustment of drivers accustomed to operating automobiles than most type of small trucks, they found especially strong acceptance in rental truck fleets. Usually, the entrance is via a large door in the rear which opens almost the full width of the body. Some models such as those offered by U-Haul use small dual rear wheels to provide the least amount of intrusion of the rear wheel wells into the cargo area.

Recreational vehicles (motor homes)

A recreational vehicle (or "RV") is a motor vehicle dually used as both a vehicle and a temporary travel home. They are also called "motor homes" and are very popular in North America. By the mid 1970s, recreational vehicle builders were building models based upon cutaway van chassis.

Within the industry, a motor home based upon a cutaway van chassis is a Class C motor home. It is built on a truck chassis with an attached cab section, which is usually cutaway van chassis based (but may also be pickup truck based or even large truck based). They are often (but not necessarily) characterized by a distinctive "cab-over" profile, the portion of the coach over the cab containing a bed or an "entertainment" section.

See also

 Ambulance
 Bus manufacturer
 Bus manufacturing
 Conversion van
 Delivery (commerce)
 Minibus
 Multi-stop truck
 Recreational vehicle

References

Recreational vehicle manufacturers
School buses
Trucks